The Lab or Llap, is a river in the north-eastern part of Kosovo. Near its origin are remains of medieval palace of Serbian king Milutin (1282-1321) called Vrhlab (Serbian Cyrillic: , which means origin of the Lab).

Name etymology
The etymology of the river's name is derived from a pre-Slavic form Alb that underwent linguistic metathesis within Slavic giving the final form as Lab.

Upper Lab
The Lab originates as the Murgulla from the Kopaonik mountain, between the Pilatovica and Bela Stena peaks, on the border of Kosovo and Serbia. The river flows southward, through the region of Upper Lab, by the villages of Marince, Bela Stena, Murgula, Brece and Metohija, receives several smaller streams from the Kopaonik and after it passes the village of Donja Pakaštica, the Lab enters the Malo Kosovo field.

Small Kosovo
Malo Kosovo is located between the mountains of Kopaonik (north) and Prugovac (south) and, unlike the Gornji Lab, it is densely populated. After the villages of Dobri Do, Bajčina, Perane and Letance, the Lab reaches the town of Podujevo. At this point, the river bends gently to the southwest and its valley becomes the route for the regional road and railway Niš-Pristina. After the larger village of Glavnik, the Lab receives from the left the Batlava river at the village of Lužane, and from the right its major tributary, the Kačandolska reka by the village of Donje Ljupče.

Large Kosovo
At Vrani Do and Besinje villages, the Lab slowly turns west, passing the villages of Raškovo, Miloševo, Prilužje, and Reka, where it empties into the Sitnica.

Notes and references 

Notes:

References:

 Mala Prosvetina Enciklopedija, Third edition (1985); Prosveta; 
 Jovan Đ. Marković (1990): Enciklopedijski geografski leksikon Jugoslavije; Svjetlost-Sarajevo;

External links

Rivers of Kosovo